"Vy från ett luftslott" (Swedish for View From a Castle in the Air) is the fourth and final single released from the album Tillbaka till samtiden, by the Swedish alternative rock band Kent.

This is a one-track single featuring a remix of "Vy från ett luftslott" by Punks Jump Up. It was first released as a free download on Kent's website on 15 June 2008, then on CD on 2 July 2008. The remix is also used in the official music video, where Kent held a contest and asked fans to submit their own music videos. The band choose five finalist out of 65 entries, and the winner was selected in a poll on the band's forum.

Track listing

Charts

References

External links 
Vy Från Ett Luftslott (Punks Jump Up Remix) at Discogs

2008 singles
Kent (band) songs
2007 songs
Sony BMG singles
Songs written by Joakim Berg
Songs written by Martin Sköld
Song recordings produced by Joshua (record producer)
2008 songs